is a Japanese politician and former member of the House of Representatives.

Early life and education
Tarutoko was born in Shimane Prefecture on 6 August 1959. He studied at the Matsushita Institute of Government and Management.

Career
Tarutoko was first elected to the House of Representatives in the 1993 election as a member of the defunct Japan New Party. Then he joined the Democratic Party of Japan in 1998.

In June 2010, he declared his intention to run against Naoto Kan for the leadership of the Democratic Party of Japan; had he won, he would have become the next Prime Minister of Japan. However, he was defeated on a 291–129 vote. He was appointed Minister of Internal Affairs and Communications by Prime Minister Yoshihiko Noda on 1 October 2012.

He lost his seat in the 16 December 2012 general election to Tomokatsu Kitagawa, who he had defeated in the 2009 election. Tarutoko challenged Kitagawa again in 2014, but failed. He became the top candidate on Kibō no Tō's Kinki proportional representation list in 2017 and was elected back to the House.

Tarutoko resigned his seat on 28 January 2019 to contest the Osaka 12th district by-election, which was called after Kitagawa's death.

References

|-

|-

|-

|-

|-

|-

|-

|-

1959 births
Democratic Party of Japan politicians
Living people
Members of the House of Representatives (Japan)
Osaka University alumni
People from Shimane Prefecture
Ministers of Internal Affairs of Japan
21st-century Japanese politicians